Desmond Kelly is a Ceylonese musician who has entertained  in Sri Lanka and in Australia. He was born in Colombo in 1936.

Songs on Radio Ceylon
Kelly was one of a group of musicians who was discovered by Radio Ceylon, now the Sri Lanka Broadcasting Corporation. Radio Ceylon gave him a platform for his songs and announcers Vernon Corea and Christopher Greet played his compositions on their music programs - Radio Ceylon made him into a household name - not only in Sri Lanka but also in the Indian sub-continent. His pop hit Dream World was in the hit parades in both Ceylon and India. He has also been featured in the top entertainment column, EMCEE, published in the Ceylon Daily News in the 1960s.

Acting Career in Australia
Des Kelly is best known for such pop hits such as Dream World, Cha Cha Baby, and The Reason Being. He migrated with his family to Melbourne, Australia in 1962 where he worked as an entertainer. Kelly also became an actor and appeared on TV shows such as Homicide,  Hunter and The Flying Doctors for Crawford Productions and as a solo entertainer on some of the top television shows in Australia, such as In Melbourne Tonight, the Delo & Daly show and Reg Lindsay's Country Hour which was produced in Adelaide, Australia. He is also known for a road safety song in Australia titled It's You.

He has collaborated with fellow Australian musician Robin Foenander on a range of pop songs. Des Kelly has also released CDs which include the popular Sri Lankan baila music and calypso songs.

Des Kelly is now semi-retired although he is still in demand in Melbourne as an entertainer.

See also 
Radio Ceylon
Music of Sri Lanka
Vernon Corea

References

External links 

World Music Central articles on Des Kelly
The Official Website of the Sri Lanka Broadcasting Corporation
World Music Central: Des Kelly on Vernon Corea

1936 births
Australian male singers
Australian musicians
Australian people of Sri Lankan descent
Burgher musicians
Living people
People from Colombo
People from British Ceylon